Brydone is a surname of Scottish origin. Notable people with the surname include:

 James Marr Brydone (1779–1866), Scottish surgeon.
 Patrick Brydone (1736–1818), Scottish traveller and author.
 Thomas Brydone (1837–1904), New Zealand land-company manager.

See also
 Brydone, Southland 
 Brydon (disambiguation)
 Bryden

References

Scottish surnames